The 1956 Cleveland Indians posted an 88-66 won-loss record, good for second place and 9 games behind the first place New York Yankees.

Offseason
 October 24, 1955: Ralph Kiner was released by the Indians.
 October 25, 1955: Larry Doby was traded by the Indians to the Chicago White Sox for Chico Carrasquel and Jim Busby.

Regular season

Season standings

Record vs. opponents

Roster

Game log

|-align="center" bgcolor="#ffbbbb"
| 1 || April 17 || @ White Sox || 2–1 || Pierce (1–0) || Lemon (0–1) || 16,773 || 0–1
|-align="center" bgcolor="#ffbbbb"
| 2 || April 19 || @ White Sox || 1–0 || Harshman (1–0) || Score (0–1) || 5,369 || 0–2
|-align="center" bgcolor="#bbffbb"
| 3 || April 20 || Tigers || 3–1 || Wynn (1–0) || Garver (0–1) || 31,689 || 1–2
|-align="center" bgcolor="#ffbbbb"
| 4 || April 21 || Tigers || 7–6 || Aber (1–0) || Garcia (0–1) || 4,224 || 1–3
|-align="center" bgcolor="#ffbbbb"
| 5 || April 22 || Tigers || 6–4 || Black (1–0) || Narleski (0–1) || || 1–4
|-align="center" bgcolor="#bbffbb"
| 6 || April 22 || Tigers || 5–2 || Lemon (1–1) || Marlowe (0–1) || 12,980 || 2–4
|-align="center" bgcolor="#bbffbb"
| 7 || April 25 || @ Athletics || 5–2 || Score (1–1) || Shantz (1–1) || 18,005 || 3–4
|-align="center" bgcolor="#bbffbb"
| 8 || April 26 || @ Athletics || 14–2 || Wynn (2–0) || Kretlow (0–1) || 9,014 || 4–4
|-align="center" bgcolor="#bbffbb"
| 9 || April 27 || @ Tigers || 4 – 3 (10) || Mossi (1–0) || Lary (0–2) || 3,735 || 5–4
|-align="center" bgcolor="#ffbbbb"
| 10 || April 29 || @ Tigers || 1 – 0 (10) || Hoeft (1–0) || Score (1–2) || || 5–5
|-align="center" bgcolor="#bbffbb"
| 11 || April 29 || @ Tigers || 8–4 || Lemon (2–1) || Black (1–1) || 22,222 || 6–5
|-

|-align="center" bgcolor="#bbffbb"
| 12 || May 1 || @ Senators || 3–2 || Wynn (3–0) || Ramos (1–1) || 9,639 || 7–5
|-align="center" bgcolor="#bbffbb"
| 13 || May 3 || @ Orioles || 7–1 || Garcia (1–1) || Wight (0–4) || 12,378 || 8–5
|-align="center" bgcolor="#ffbbbb"
| 14 || May 4 || @ Orioles || 4–3 || Wilson (3–0) || Score (1–3) || 8,130 || 8–6
|-align="center" bgcolor="#bbffbb"
| 15 || May 5 || @ Orioles || 2–1 || Lemon (3–1) || Ferrarese (0–1) || 9,270 || 9–6
|-align="center" bgcolor="#ffbbbb"
| 16 || May 7 || @ Red Sox || 5–1 || Brewer (3–1) || Garcia (1–2) || 4,396 || 9–7
|-align="center" bgcolor="#ffbbbb"
| 17 || May 8 || @ Yankees || 4–3 || Kucks (3–1) || Wynn (3–1) || 8,794 || 9–8
|-align="center" bgcolor="#bbffbb"
| 18 || May 9 || @ Yankees || 6–5 || Score (2–3) || Morgan (0–3) || 12,225 || 10–8
|-align="center" bgcolor="#bbffbb"
| 19 || May 10 || @ Yankees || 7–2 || Lemon (4–1) || McDermott (1–2) || 10,382 || 11–8
|-align="center" bgcolor="#bbffbb"
| 20 || May 11 || Athletics || 4 – 1 (5) || Garcia (2–2) || Kretlow (1–3) || 8,622 || 12–8
|-align="center" bgcolor="#bbffbb"
| 21 || May 12 || Athletics || 5–3 || Wynn (4–1) || Herriage (0–1) || 4,728 || 13–8
|-align="center" bgcolor="#ffbbbb"
| 22 || May 13 || Athletics || 5–2 || Ditmar (3–2) || Feller (0–1) || || 13–9
|-align="center" bgcolor="#bbffbb"
| 23 || May 13 || Athletics || 9–4 || Score (3–3) || Lasorda (0–1) || 11,308 || 14–9
|-align="center" bgcolor="#bbffbb"
| 24 || May 14 || Yankees || 3–2 || Lemon (5–1) || Kucks (3–2) || 18,950 || 15–9
|-align="center" bgcolor="#ffbbbb"
| 25 || May 16 || Yankees || 4–1 || Morgan (1–3) || Garcia (2–3) || 6,263 || 15–10
|-align="center" bgcolor="#ffbbbb"
| 26 || May 18 || Senators || 5 – 4 (11) || Stewart (2–0) || Narleski (0–2) || 7,747 || 15–11
|-align="center" bgcolor="#bbffbb"
| 27 || May 19 || Senators || 5–1 || Score (4–3) || Pascual (2–5) || 4,666 || 16–11
|-align="center" bgcolor="#bbffbb"
| 28 || May 20 || Orioles || 6–1 || Lemon (6–1) || Wilson (4–2) || || 17–11
|-align="center" bgcolor="#bbffbb"
| 29 || May 20 || Orioles || 5–1 || Garcia (3–3) || Palica (2–5) || 12,318 || 18–11
|-align="center" bgcolor="#ffbbbb"
| 30 || May 22 || Red Sox || 5–3 || Brewer (5–1) || Wynn (4–2) || 15,286 || 18–12
|-align="center" bgcolor="#bbffbb"
| 31 || May 23 || Red Sox || 6–3 || Score (5–3) || Sullivan (3–1) || 3,700 || 19–12
|-align="center" bgcolor="#ffbbbb"
| 32 || May 25 || @ White Sox || 2–1 || Pierce (5–1) || Garcia (3–4) || 31,840 || 19–13
|-align="center" bgcolor="#ffbbbb"
| 33 || May 27 || @ White Sox || 5 – 4 (15) || Wilson (1–0) || McLish (0–1) || 23,857 || 19–14
|-align="center" bgcolor="#bbffbb"
| 34 || May 27 || @ White Sox || 4–2 || Wynn (5–2) || Harshman (2–3) || 25,856 || 20–14
|-align="center" bgcolor="#ffbbbb"
| 35 || May 28 || Tigers || 3–1 || Gromek (3–3) || Score (5–4) || 9,546 || 20–15
|-align="center" bgcolor="#ffbbbb"
| 36 || May 30 || White Sox || 6–3 || Pierce (6–3) || Houtteman (0–1) || || 20–16
|-align="center" bgcolor="#ffbbbb"
| 37 || May 30 || White Sox || 9–8 || Staley (1–0) || Garcia (3–5) || 26,788 || 20–17
|-

|-align="center" bgcolor="#ffbbbb"
| 38 || June 1 || @ Senators || 5–3 || Wiesler (1–2) || Lemon (6–2) || 4,738 || 20–18
|-align="center" bgcolor="#bbffbb"
| 39 || June 2 || @ Senators || 15–0 || Score (6–4) || Stone (2–1) || 2,317 || 21–18
|-align="center" bgcolor="#bbffbb"
| 40 || June 3 || @ Senators || 8 – 4 (12) || McLish (1–1) || Chakales (3–3) || || 22–18
|-align="center" bgcolor="#ffbbbb"
| 41 || June 3 || @ Senators || 7–1 || Griggs (1–2) || Mossi (1–1) || 11,817 || 22–19
|-align="center" bgcolor="#bbffbb"
| 42 || June 4 || @ Senators || 7–0 || Garcia (4–5) || Ramos (3–3) || 5,021 || 23–19
|-align="center" bgcolor="#bbffbb"
| 43 || June 5 || @ Orioles || 8–3 || Lemon (7–2) || Moore (4–4) || 25,041 || 24–19
|-align="center" bgcolor="#bbffbb"
| 44 || June 6 || @ Orioles || 5–1 || Houtteman (1–1) || Johnson (1–2) || 12,363 || 25–19
|-align="center" bgcolor="#ffbbbb"
| 45 || June 7 || @ Orioles || 5–2 || Wight (3–5) || McLish (1–2) || 3,927 || 25–20
|-align="center" bgcolor="#bbffbb"
| 46 || June 8 || @ Yankees || 9–0 || Wynn (6–2) || Ford (7–3) || 50,812 || 26–20
|-align="center" bgcolor="#bbffbb"
| 47 || June 9 || @ Yankees || 15–8 || Daley (1–0) || Morgan (2–5) || 31,419 || 27–20
|-align="center" bgcolor="#ffbbbb"
| 48 || June 10 || @ Yankees || 6–0 || Kucks (7–3) || Lemon (7–3) || 47,465 || 27–21
|-align="center" bgcolor="#bbffbb"
| 49 || June 11 || @ Red Sox || 4–1 || McLish (2–2) || Porterfield (2–5) || 6,330 || 28–21
|-align="center" bgcolor="#ffbbbb"
| 50 || June 11 || @ Red Sox || 5–1 || Brewer (9–1) || Garcia (4–6) || 24,193 || 28–22
|-align="center" bgcolor="#ffbbbb"
| 51 || June 12 || @ Red Sox || 9–7 || Sullivan (5–3) || Wynn (6–3) || 29,190 || 28–23
|-align="center" bgcolor="#ffffff"
| 52 || June 13 || @ Red Sox || 8–8 || || || 8,258 || 28–23
|-align="center" bgcolor="#ffbbbb"
| 53 || June 14 || @ Red Sox || 10–9 || Delock (2–4) || Lemon (7–4) || 7,136 || 28–24
|-align="center" bgcolor="#ffbbbb"
| 54 || June 15 || Yankees || 6–2 || Kucks (8–3) || Garcia (4–7) || 34,025 || 28–25
|-align="center" bgcolor="#ffbbbb"
| 55 || June 16 || Yankees || 3–1 || Sturdivant (4–1) || Score (6–5) || 40,964 || 28–26
|-align="center" bgcolor="#ffbbbb"
| 56 || June 17 || Yankees || 9–4 || Coleman (2–1) || Wynn (6–4) || 41,765 || 28–27
|-align="center" bgcolor="#bbffbb"
| 57 || June 19 || Red Sox || 9–7 || Lemon (8–4) || Delock (2–5) || 14,684 || 29–27
|-align="center" bgcolor="#bbffbb"
| 58 || June 20 || Red Sox || 5 – 4 (10) || Mossi (2–1) || Hurd (1–3) || 14,271 || 30–27
|-align="center" bgcolor="#bbffbb"
| 59 || June 21 || Red Sox || 5–0 || Wynn (7–4) || Brewer (9–2) || 6,498 || 31–27
|-align="center" bgcolor="#bbffbb"
| 60 || June 22 || Senators || 4–0 || Garcia (5–7) || Stobbs (5–5) || 9,946 || 32–27
|-align="center" bgcolor="#bbffbb"
| 61 || June 23 || Senators || 9–8 || Narleski (1–2) || Ramos (4–6) || 4,691 || 33–27
|-align="center" bgcolor="#bbffbb"
| 62 || June 24 || Senators || 7 – 2 (6) || Lemon (9–4) || Wiesler (2–4) || 13,072 || 34–27
|-align="center" bgcolor="#bbffbb"
| 63 || June 26 || Orioles || 4–3 || Wynn (8–4) || Zuverink (4–3) || 8,250 || 35–27
|-align="center" bgcolor="#bbffbb"
| 64 || June 27 || Orioles || 12 – 11 (11) || Mossi (3–1) || Brown (4–1) || 4,514 || 36–27
|-align="center" bgcolor="#bbffbb"
| 65 || June 29 || White Sox || 5–2 || Score (7–5) || Wilson (10–4) || || 37–27
|-align="center" bgcolor="#ffbbbb"
| 66 || June 29 || White Sox || 13–2 || Pierce (12–2) || Lemon (9–5) || 34,371 || 37–28
|-align="center" bgcolor="#ffbbbb"
| 67 || June 30 || White Sox || 8–3 || Staley (3–0) || Mossi (3–2) || 10,801 || 37–29
|-

|-align="center" bgcolor="#bbffbb"
| 68 || July 1 || White Sox || 7–6 || Narleski (2–2) || Consuegra (1–2) || || 38–29
|-align="center" bgcolor="#bbffbb"
| 69 || July 1 || White Sox || 6–1 || Lemon (10–5) || Donovan (4–3) || 31,857 || 39–29
|-align="center" bgcolor="#bbffbb"
| 70 || July 3 || Athletics || 9–3 || Narleski (3–2) || Ditmar (6–9) || 6,221 || 40–29
|-align="center" bgcolor="#bbffbb"
| 71 || July 4 || @ Tigers || 6–4 || Score (8–5) || Foytack (5–6) || || 41–29
|-align="center" bgcolor="#bbffbb"
| 72 || July 4 || @ Tigers || 3–1 || Wynn (9–4) || Maas (0–5) || 33,151 || 42–29
|-align="center" bgcolor="#ffbbbb"
| 73 || July 5 || @ Tigers || 13–7 || Lary (5–10) || Lemon (10–6) || 5,270 || 42–30
|-align="center" bgcolor="#bbffbb"
| 74 || July 6 || @ Athletics || 4–2 || Garcia (6–7) || Herriage (1–8) || 16,171 || 43–30
|-align="center" bgcolor="#ffbbbb"
| 75 || July 7 || @ Athletics || 5–2 || Ditmar (7–9) || Score (8–6) || 16,342 || 43–31
|-align="center" bgcolor="#bbffbb"
| 76 || July 8 || @ Athletics || 17–3 || Wynn (10–4) || McMahan (0–3) || 15,958 || 44–31
|-align="center" bgcolor="#ffbbbb"
| 77 || July 12 || @ Yankees || 9–5 || Kucks (12–4) || Lemon (10–7) || 24,329 || 44–32
|-align="center" bgcolor="#ffbbbb"
| 78 || July 13 || @ Yankees || 10–0 || Sturdivant (8–2) || Wynn (10–5) || 40,664 || 44–33
|-align="center" bgcolor="#ffbbbb"
| 79 || July 14 || @ Yankees || 5 – 4 (10) || Byrne (4–1) || Mossi (3–3) || 27,358 || 44–34
|-align="center" bgcolor="#bbffbb"
| 80 || July 15 || @ Red Sox || 10–7 || Houtteman (2–1) || Nixon (3–3) || || 45–34
|-align="center" bgcolor="#ffbbbb"
| 81 || July 15 || @ Red Sox || 3–1 || Sisler (4–3) || Garcia (6–8) || 32,290 || 45–35
|-align="center" bgcolor="#bbffbb"
| 82 || July 16 || @ Red Sox || 7–3 || Lemon (11–7) || Sullivan (8–4) || 14,262 || 46–35
|-align="center" bgcolor="#ffbbbb"
| 83 || July 18 || @ Senators || 7–5 || Ramos (6–7) || Feller (0–2) || || 46–36
|-align="center" bgcolor="#bbffbb"
| 84 || July 18 || @ Senators || 11–1 || Aguirre (1–0) || Pascual (4–11) || 8,022 || 47–36
|-align="center" bgcolor="#ffbbbb"
| 85 || July 19 || @ Senators || 5–4 || Stewart (4–2) || McLish (2–3) || 3,178 || 47–37
|-align="center" bgcolor="#bbffbb"
| 86 || July 21 || @ Orioles || 4–3 || Lemon (12–7) || Ferrarese (4–7) || || 48–37
|-align="center" bgcolor="#bbffbb"
| 87 || July 21 || @ Orioles || 4 – 3 (10) || Mossi (4–3) || Loes (1–3) || 22,986 || 49–37
|-align="center" bgcolor="#bbffbb"
| 88 || July 22 || @ Orioles || 8–0 || Wynn (11–5) || Wight (5–8) || 10,019 || 50–37
|-align="center" bgcolor="#bbffbb"
| 89 || July 24 || Senators || 11–0 || Garcia (7–8) || Stewart (4–3) || 9,582 || 51–37
|-align="center" bgcolor="#bbffbb"
| 90 || July 25 || Senators || 11–3 || Score (9–6) || Pascual (4–12) || 5,099 || 52–37
|-align="center" bgcolor="#bbffbb"
| 91 || July 26 || Senators || 1 – 0 (7) || Lemon (13–7) || Stobbs (7–8) || 6,804 || 53–37
|-align="center" bgcolor="#bbffbb"
| 92 || July 27 || Orioles || 3–2 || Wynn (12–5) || Schmitz (0–2) || 10,063 || 54–37
|-align="center" bgcolor="#ffbbbb"
| 93 || July 28 || Orioles || 8–6 || Johnson (4–5) || Garcia (7–9) || 5,172 || 54–38
|-align="center" bgcolor="#bbffbb"
| 94 || July 29 || Orioles || 3–0 || Score (10–6) || Palica (3–9) || || 55–38
|-align="center" bgcolor="#bbffbb"
| 95 || July 29 || Orioles || 4–0 || Aguirre (2–0) || Ferrarese (4–8) || 13,005 || 56–38
|-align="center" bgcolor="#ffbbbb"
| 96 || July 30 || Yankees || 13–6 || Ford (14–4) || Lemon (13–8) || 22,659 || 56–39
|-align="center" bgcolor="#bbffbb"
| 97 || July 31 || Yankees || 5–0 || Wynn (13–5) || Kucks (14–6) || 29,619 || 57–39
|-

|-align="center" bgcolor="#bbffbb"
| 98 || August 1 || Yankees || 5–1 || Lemon (14–8) || Byrne (6–2) || 32,915 || 58–39
|-align="center" bgcolor="#bbffbb"
| 99 || August 2 || Yankees || 4–0 || Score (11–6) || Sturdivant (9–5) || 25,266 || 59–39
|-align="center" bgcolor="#ffbbbb"
| 100 || August 3 || Red Sox || 7–1 || Parnell (5–2) || Garcia (7–10) || 1,858 || 59–40
|-align="center" bgcolor="#ffbbbb"
| 101 || August 4 || Red Sox || 6 – 5 (10) || Delock (9–6) || Garcia (7–11) || 13,683 || 59–41
|-align="center" bgcolor="#ffbbbb"
| 102 || August 5 || Red Sox || 2 – 1 (7) || Sisler (5–5) || Lemon (14–9) || 28,924 || 59–42
|-align="center" bgcolor="#ffbbbb"
| 103 || August 6 || @ Tigers || 9–0 || Foytack (9–8) || Score (11–7) || 29,813 || 59–43
|-align="center" bgcolor="#bbffbb"
| 104 || August 7 || @ Tigers || 5–2 || Garcia (8–11) || Lary (10–12) || 11,963 || 60–43
|-align="center" bgcolor="#ffbbbb"
| 105 || August 8 || @ White Sox || 7 – 6 (14) || Staley (4–1) || McLish (2–4) || 26,606 || 60–44
|-align="center" bgcolor="#ffbbbb"
| 106 || August 9 || @ White Sox || 9–2 || Harshman (9–7) || Wynn (13–6) || 9,050 || 60–45
|-align="center" bgcolor="#bbffbb"
| 107 || August 10 || @ Athletics || 11–0 || Lemon (15–9) || Burnette (2–4) || 13,463 || 61–45
|-align="center" bgcolor="#bbffbb"
| 108 || August 11 || @ Athletics || 8–5 || Mossi (5–3) || Crimian (1–6) || 13,594 || 62–45
|-align="center" bgcolor="#bbffbb"
| 109 || August 12 || @ Athletics || 6–3 || Score (12–7) || Kretlow (4–6) || 16,702 || 63–45
|-align="center" bgcolor="#ffbbbb"
| 110 || August 14 || Tigers || 6 – 4 (15) || Bunning (3–1) || Mossi (5–4) || 14,148 || 63–46
|-align="center" bgcolor="#ffbbbb"
| 111 || August 15 || Tigers || 1–0 || Lary (12–12) || Lemon (15–10) || 11,858 || 63–47
|-align="center" bgcolor="#bbffbb"
| 112 || August 16 || Tigers || 5–4 || Score (13–7) || Hoeft (14–10) || 7,217 || 64–47
|-align="center" bgcolor="#ffbbbb"
| 113 || August 17 || Athletics || 9–3 || Crimian (2–6) || Aguirre (2–1) || 7,406 || 64–48
|-align="center" bgcolor="#bbffbb"
| 114 || August 18 || Athletics || 8–1 || Wynn (14–6) || Kretlow (4–7) || 4,355 || 65–48
|-align="center" bgcolor="#bbffbb"
| 115 || August 19 || Athletics || 5–2 || Lemon (16–10) || Burnette (2–6) || || 66–48
|-align="center" bgcolor="#bbffbb"
| 116 || August 19 || Athletics || 2–1 || Garcia (9–11) || Ditmar (9–16) || 10,319 || 67–48
|-align="center" bgcolor="#bbffbb"
| 117 || August 21 || @ Yankees || 3–0 || Score (14–7) || Larsen (7–5) || 39,187 || 68–48
|-align="center" bgcolor="#ffbbbb"
| 118 || August 22 || @ Yankees || 3–2 || Sturdivant (12–6) || Wynn (14–7) || 23,584 || 68–49
|-align="center" bgcolor="#ffbbbb"
| 119 || August 23 || @ Red Sox || 2–1 || Parnell (7–3) || Lemon (16–11) || 26,439 || 68–50
|-align="center" bgcolor="#bbffbb"
| 120 || August 24 || @ Red Sox || 5–3 || Garcia (10–11) || Brewer (16–7) || 6,047 || 69–50
|-align="center" bgcolor="#ffbbbb"
| 121 || August 25 || @ Red Sox || 9–6 || Sisler (6–6) || Score (14–8) || 19,830 || 69–51
|-align="center" bgcolor="#bbffbb"
| 122 || August 26 || @ Senators || 4–1 || Wynn (15–7) || Stone (4–5) || 6,880 || 70–51
|-align="center" bgcolor="#bbffbb"
| 123 || August 27 || @ Senators || 5–2 || Lemon (17–11) || Griggs (1–6) || 4,879 || 71–51
|-align="center" bgcolor="#ffbbbb"
| 124 || August 28 || @ Orioles || 1–0 || Moore (11–6) || Aguirre (2–2) || 13,673 || 71–52
|-align="center" bgcolor="#bbffbb"
| 125 || August 29 || @ Orioles || 3–2 || Mossi (6–4) || Fornieles (3–7) || 8,882 || 72–52
|-align="center" bgcolor="#bbffbb"
| 126 || August 31 || @ White Sox || 3–2 || Score (15–8) || Pierce (18–7) || || 73–52
|-align="center" bgcolor="#ffbbbb"
| 127 || August 31 || @ White Sox || 1 – 0 (10) || Donovan (9–7) || Wynn (15–8) || 31,445 || 73–53
|-

|-align="center" bgcolor="#bbffbb"
| 128 || September 1 || @ White Sox || 5–1 || Lemon (18–11) || Staley (5–2) || 17,749 || 74–53
|-align="center" bgcolor="#ffbbbb"
| 129 || September 2 || @ White Sox || 4–3 || Harshman (12–9) || Aguirre (2–3) || 14,704 || 74–54
|-align="center" bgcolor="#ffbbbb"
| 130 || September 3 || @ Athletics || 5–2 || Gorman (8–8) || Garcia (10–12) || 13,459 || 74–55
|-align="center" bgcolor="#bbffbb"
| 131 || September 3 || @ Athletics || 2–1 || Wynn (16–8) || Burnette (3–7) || 11,837 || 75–55
|-align="center" bgcolor="#ffbbbb"
| 132 || September 4 || @ Athletics || 5–2 || Crimian (3–7) || Score (15–9) || 7,332 || 75–56
|-align="center" bgcolor="#ffbbbb"
| 133 || September 7 || White Sox || 2–1 || Harshman (13–9) || Lemon (18–12) || 11,202 || 75–57
|-align="center" bgcolor="#ffbbbb"
| 134 || September 8 || White Sox || 4–2 || Pierce (19–7) || Wynn (16–9) || 5,583 || 75–58
|-align="center" bgcolor="#bbffbb"
| 135 || September 9 || White Sox || 4–1 || Score (16–9) || Donovan (10–8) || || 76–58
|-align="center" bgcolor="#ffbbbb"
| 136 || September 9 || White Sox || 6–2 || Staley (6–2) || Aguirre (2–4) || 28,457 || 76–59
|-align="center" bgcolor="#bbffbb"
| 137 || September 11 || Orioles || 3–1 || Lemon (19–12) || Moore (11–7) || 5,427 || 77–59
|-align="center" bgcolor="#bbffbb"
| 138 || September 12 || Orioles || 2–1 || Wynn (17–9) || Brown (9–5) || 4,738 || 78–59
|-align="center" bgcolor="#ffbbbb"
| 139 || September 13 || Orioles || 4–1 || Johnson (8–10) || Aguirre (2–5) || 1,663 || 78–60
|-align="center" bgcolor="#bbffbb"
| 140 || September 14 || Red Sox || 10–2 || Score (17–9) || Parnell (7–5) || || 79–60
|-align="center" bgcolor="#ffbbbb"
| 141 || September 14 || Red Sox || 4–3 || Sisler (7–7) || Mossi (6–5) || 10,000 || 79–61
|-align="center" bgcolor="#ffbbbb"
| 142 || September 15 || Red Sox || 5–3 || Delock (13–6) || Feller (0–3) || 5,242 || 79–62
|-align="center" bgcolor="#ffbbbb"
| 143 || September 16 || Yankees || 10–3 || Sturdivant (15–8) || Lemon (19–13) || || 79–63
|-align="center" bgcolor="#bbffbb"
| 144 || September 16 || Yankees || 4–3 || Wynn (18–9) || Kucks (18–8) || 39,651 || 80–63
|-align="center" bgcolor="#bbffbb"
| 145 || September 18 || Senators || 1–0 || Score (18–9) || Wiesler (3–12) || || 81–63
|-align="center" bgcolor="#bbffbb"
| 146 || September 18 || Senators || 6–0 || Garcia (11–12) || Stobbs (15–13) || 4,305 || 82–63
|-align="center" bgcolor="#bbffbb"
| 147 || September 19 || Senators || 6 – 0 (7) || Lemon (20–13) || Abernathy (1–1) || 365 || 83–63
|-align="center" bgcolor="#bbffbb"
| 148 || September 21 || @ Tigers || 5–1 || Wynn (19–9) || Hoeft (18–13) || 19,199 || 84–63
|-align="center" bgcolor="#bbffbb"
| 149 || September 22 || @ Tigers || 5–1 || Score (19–9) || Foytack (14–13) || 7,738 || 85–63
|-align="center" bgcolor="#ffbbbb"
| 150 || September 23 || @ Tigers || 11–1 || Lary (20–13) || Lemon (20–14) || 13,300 || 85–64
|-align="center" bgcolor="#bbffbb"
| 151 || September 25 || Athletics || 4 – 1 (10) || Wynn (20–9) || Crimian (4–8) || 3,604 || 86–64
|-align="center" bgcolor="#bbffbb"
| 152 || September 26 || Athletics || 8–4 || Score (20–9) || Ditmar (12–22) || 3,630 || 87–64
|-align="center" bgcolor="#bbffbb"
| 153 || September 28 || Tigers || 2–1 || Aguirre (3–5) || Hoeft (19–14) || 4,528 || 88–64
|-align="center" bgcolor="#ffbbbb"
| 154 || September 29 || Tigers || 9–1 || Lary (21–13) || Houtteman (2–2) || 2,946 || 88–65
|-align="center" bgcolor="#ffbbbb"
| 155 || September 30 || Tigers || 8–4 || Hoeft (20–14) || Feller (0–4) || 5,910 || 88–66
|-

Player stats

Batting

Starters by position
Note: Pos = Position; G = Games played; AB = At bats; R = Runs scored; H = Hits; AVG = Batting average; 2B = Doubles; 3B = Triples; HR = Home runs; RBI = Runs batted in; SB = Stolen bases

Other batters
Note: G = Games played; AB = At bats; R = Runs scored; H = Hits; AVG = Batting average; 2B = Doubles; 3B = Triples; HR = Home runs; RBI = Runs batted in; SB = Stolen bases

Pitching

Starting pitchers
Note: G = Games pitched; GS = Games started; IP = Innings pitched; W = Wins; L = Losses; ERA = Earned run average; BB = Walks allowed; K = Strikeouts

Other pitchers
Note: G = Games pitched; GS = Games started; IP = Innings pitched; W = Wins; L = Losses; ERA = Earned run average; BB = Walks allowed; K = Strikeouts

Relief pitchers
Note: G = Games pitched; IP = Innings pitched; W = Wins; L = Losses; ERA = Earned run average; BB = Walks allowed; K = Strikeouts

Award winners

All-Star Game

Farm system

LEAGUE CHAMPIONS: Indianapolis, Fayetteville

In 1956, the Indianapolis Indians were 92–62. On May 18, they defeated the Louisville Colonels by a score of 24–0. Roger Maris had seven runs batted in for the game. The Indians went on to win the 1956 Junior World Series by defeating the Rochester Red Wings. In Game 2 of the Junior World Series, Maris would set a record by getting seven runs batted in.

Notes

References
1956 Cleveland Indians at Baseball Reference
1956 Cleveland Indians at Baseball Almanac
1956 WS at Baseball Reference

Cleveland Indians seasons
Cleveland Indians season
Cleveland Indians